The 2014 Indonesia Super League was the sixth season of the Indonesia Super League (ISL), a fully professional football competition as the top tier of the football league pyramid in Indonesia. The season was scheduled to begin in January 2014, but in the end PSSI decided that the competition would begin on 1 February 2014 and possibly end on 7 November 2014. Competition schedule was released on 17 January 2014 by PT Liga Indonesia in Jakarta.

Persipura were the defending champions, having won their fourth league title in 2013.

This season saw the merging of the ISL with the Indonesian Premier League (IPL) after three years of dualism. It was decided that only four teams from the Premier League would join the new Super League.

The 22 clubs were divided into two groups (regions) so that each group contained eleven participating teams; this was due to the many political agenda in Indonesia in 2014 such as the parliamentary election on 9 April 2014 and the Presidential election on 9 July 2014.

Teams
Indonesia Super League was followed by 22 clubs consisting of fourteen Super League teams, four teams of the Premier League, three Premier Division teams and one team winning the play-off between ranked 15th Super League and ranked 4th Premier Division.

PSPS Pekanbaru, Persidafon Dafonsoro and Persiwa Wamena were relegated during the end of the Previous season. They were replaced by the best three teams from the 2013 Liga Indonesia Premier Division (LI), Persebaya DU (Bhayangkara), Perseru Serui and Persik Kediri.

Fourth-placed Premier Division side Persikabo Bogor failed to be promoted to the Super League after losing to the 15th-placed finishers of 2013 Super League, Pelita Bandung Raya by the score of 2–1.

Four teams of the 2013 Indonesian Premier League would participate: Semen Padang, Persiba Bantul, Persijap Jepara and PSM Makassar.

The whole composition of the 22 teams above was decided by the PSSI executive committee members that were qualified as participants in the Indonesia Super League at a meeting held on 10 December 2013 at The Sultan Hotel, Jakarta. But the composition was still provisional because some clubs still had to resolve their financial problems. If not completed, they were then dropped from the competition. In addition, PSSI also gave an opportunity for the three clubs (Perseman Manokwari, Persepar Palangkaraya and Pro Duta FC) that were not included in the composition of the participants had been decided by PSSI to make an appeal.

PSSI and PT Liga Indonesia officially announced the 22 clubs were eligible to enter the Indonesia Super League (ISL) next season. See 2014 ISL schedule. The announcement of next season's participants was done by PSSI secretary general Joko Driyono in the office of PT Liga Indonesia in Kuningan Place, Kuningan, South Jakarta on Monday, 23 December 2013. With the 22 participants of the ISL, then certainly for the next season, the highest caste of Indonesian football league was divided into two areas/groups, with each area comprising 11 clubs.

Stadium and locations

Personnel and kits

Note: Flags indicate national team as has been defined under FIFA eligibility rules. Players and Managers may hold more than one non-FIFA nationality.

Coach has appointed Mekan Nasyrow as captain Barito Putera replace Fathlul Rahman. 
Coach has appointed Shohei Matsunaga as captain Gresik United replace Mahyadi Panggabean. Mahyadi take back the team captaincy before he suffered an injury, now captaincy handed by Otávio Dutra. 
Wawan Hendrawan was captain of Persiba Balikpapan, replaced by Fernando Soler began on 15 March in a game against PSM Makassar. After Soler leave club captaincy handed by Patrice Nzekou.
Coach has appointed Ezequiel González as captain Persiba Bantul replace Eduardo Bizarro. 
Boaz is Persipura captain but he suffered an injury. Ian Kabes was handed the captaincy in Boaz's absence on February.
Coach has appointed Erol Iba as captain Sriwijaya replace Lancine Koné.

Coach changes

Pre-season

In season

Foreign players

First round
The first round matches took place between 1 February and 5 September 2014.

Tie-breaking criteria

Ranking in each group shall be determined as follows:
Greater number of points obtained in all the group matches;
Result of the direct match between the teams concerned;
Goal difference in all the group matches;
Greater number of goals scored in all the group matches. 
If two or more teams are equal on the basis on the above four criteria, the place shall be determined as follows:
Drawing lots by the Organising Committee.

West

Results

East

Results

Second round

This round divided the top four teams of each region in the first round into two groups of four. The second round matches took place between 4 October and 30 October 2014.

Group A

Results

Group B

Results

Knockout stage
The semi-final matches were played on 4 November 2014 and the final was played on 7 November 2014. The matches were played at Gelora Sriwijaya Stadium.

Bracket

Semi-finals

Final

Season statistics

Last Update: 7 November 2014

Top scorers

Hat-tricks

Achievements
The selection is done by a team of Technical Study Group (TSG) which was formed by PT Liga Indonesia. Indonesia's Goal.com also make their own monthly awards.

Monthly awards

Note:
 From ISG PT. Liga Indonesia
 From Goal.com Indonesia
In July, the league will have a break due to the Presidential election and World Cup, also coincidentally with the holy month of Ramadan.

Season awards

See also
 2014 Indonesia Premier Division
 2014 Liga Nusantara

References

External links
 2014 Indonesia Super League on FIFA
 League tables and upcoming fixtures at Soccerway
 News, League tables, fixtures and results, stats at worldfootball

 
Indonesia Super League seasons

1